The 2009 Primera División Clausura was the second football tournament of the Mexican Primera División 2008−09 season. The tournament began on January 16, 2009 and ended on May 31, 2009. Necaxa was relegated to the Primera División A after being in last place of the relegation table. On May 31, 2009 UNAM defeated Pachuca 3–2 on aggregate to win their sixth title. Toluca forward Héctor Mancilla won his second consecutive golden boot after scoring 14 goals, only one ahead of América forward Salvador Cabañas.

Club information

Stadia and locations

Personnel

Managerial changes

Regular season

League table

Group standings

Results

Playoffs

 If the two teams are tied after both legs, the higher seeded team advances.
 Both finalist qualify to the 2009–10 CONCACAF Champions League. The champion qualifies directly to the Group Stage, while the runner-up qualifies to the Preliminary Round.

Awards

Top Goalscorers

Relegation table
Relegation is determined by a quotient of the total points earned in the Primera División divided by the total number of games played over the past three seasons of the Primera División (for clubs that have not been the Primera División all three season, the last consecutive seasons of participation are taken into account). The club with the lowest quotient is relegated to the Primera División A for the next season.

References

External links 
Official Website

 

Mexico
Cla